Cinematic is the first demo EP by former TNT and current Starbreaker singer Tony Harnell, released on September 23, 2008, for free on his official website, and later through Dovetone Music. It is Harnell's debut release as a solo artist. The EP featured 6 demo songs that might be re-recorded for his full-length solo album, due for release in 2010.

The album was produced by Mats Valentin who also recorded all of the instruments. Additional vocals were recorded by Swedish singer Aleena Gibson.

Demos of "Out from Under the Black Cloud", "The Show" and "Cinematic" were released in Christmas 2007, on Harnell's Myspace page. Those demos were produced by Lizette von Panajott and orchestrated by Glen Gabriel.

Track listing
 "Out from Under the Black Cloud" - 5:06
 "The Show" - 3:58
 "I Don't Want Anything" - 3:59
 "Cinematic" - 4:34
 "One Way Ride" - 4:39
 "Unholy" - 4:53

Personnel
 Tony Harnell – lead vocals
 Mats Valentin – production, guitars, bass, keyboards, drums, percussion
 Stefan Altzar - guitars, co-writer
 Aleena Gibson – co-writer
 Lizette Von Panajott - producer, singer
 Glen Gabriel - Orchestrator
 Tomas Johansson - bass

References

2008 debut EPs
Hard rock EPs
Tony Harnell albums